Jim Ward is an American retired voice actor, radio personality, and camera operator.

Biography

Radio career
From 2004 to 2014, and again from 2015 to 2017, Ward was the co-host of The Stephanie Miller Show, a nationally syndicated liberal radio talk show that features a number of his impersonations of political figures and other celebrities and news makers.

Voice over career
Ward is known for his dozens of  roles in animation and video games. During his long career, he has voiced Captain Copernicus Leslie Qwark in the Ratchet & Clank franchise, Mannimarco in The Elder Scrolls Online, Diamondhead in Ben 10 and Ben 10: Destroy All Aliens, Henry Peter Gyrich in The Avengers: Earth's Mightiest Heroes, newscaster Chet Ubetcha and Doug Dimmadome, Owner Of The Dimmsdale Dimmadome on The Fairly OddParents, Angus on The Secret Files of the Spy Dogs, and Professor Xavier in Wolverine and the X-Men.

In 2006, Ward played Eyemore, Crusher, and Stoker on Biker Mice from Mars, which was a remake of the 1990s show of the same name. The character Stoker had been played by Peter Strauss on the show, but after he left the series, Ward took over. In 2009, for his roles on the show, he was nominated and won the Daytime Emmy Award for Outstanding Performer in an Animated Program.

Health problems and retirement
In 2021, it was reported that Ward had developed symptoms of Alzheimer's disease and contracted a severe case of COVID-19, leaving him unable to continue voice acting.

Dubbing roles

Anime
 Yojimbo of the Wind – Master of Tonbo, Tanida
 Gokudo

Film
 Spirited Away – River Spirit

Filmography

Animation
 Avatar: The Last Airbender - Headmaster (Episode 3.2)
 The Avengers: Earth's Mightiest Heroes - Baron Strucker, Henry Peter Gyrich, additional voices
 Ben 10 - Diamondhead, XLR8, Wildvine, Mr. Beck, additional voices
 Biker Mice From Mars - Stoker Van Rotten (replacing Peter Strauss)
 The Brothers Flub - Additional Voices
 Crash Nebula - Pa Speevak/Dif
 Catscratch - William Champsley
 Danny Phantom - Bertrand, Operative L, Additional Voices
 The Emperor's New School - Additional voices
 The Fairly OddParents - Chet Ubetcha, Doug Dimmadome, Additional voices
 Hard Drinkin' Lincoln - Abraham Lincoln
 Hey Arnold! - Announcer (Ep. Harold vs. Patty)
 Higglytown Heroes - Grandpop Krank
 Justice League Action - Brain
 Kung Fu Panda: Legends of Awesomeness – Kwan
 Last Chance - Marine
 Legion of Super Heroes - Mordru (Ep. "Trials")
 Mighty Mouse: The New Adventures - Additional voices
 My Life as a Teenage Robot - Krackus, Additional voices
 New Looney Tunes - Squint Eatswood
 Quick Change - Police Artist
 Reader Rabbit - Sam the Lion
 The Secret Files of the Spy Dogs - Angus, Dog Chow and one of the Space Slugs
 The Super Hero Squad Show - Professor Xavier
 Tapeheads - Dutch Reagan
 We Bare Bears - Movie Theater Manager (Episode: Shush Ninjas)
 Wolverine and the X-Men - Professor X, Sentinels, Warren Worthington II, Abraham Cornelius, Rover
 Xyber 9: New Dawn - Additional voices

Film

 Area 88 - Mickey Simon
 Ben 10: Secret of the Omnitrix - Diamondhead, Ripjaws Alien, Fourarms Alien, Radio Announcer, Additional voices
 Ben 10: Destroy All Aliens - Diamondhead
 Casper: A Spirited Beginning - Stretch
 Casper Meets Wendy - Stretch
 Cars - Additional voices
 Cheetah - Announcer
 Chillerama - Anne Frank's Father
 Despicable Me 2 - Additional voices
 Despicable Me 3 - Additional voices
 Escape from Planet Earth - Grey #1
 Finding Nemo (2003) - Additional voices
 The Fairly OddParents in Abra Catastrophe! - Chet Ubetcha
 The Grinch - Additional voices
 Happily N'Ever After - Additional voices
 Hercules (1997) - Ice Titan, Additional voices
 Home on the Range - Additional voices
 Jetsons: The Movie - Additional voices
 Jimmy Timmy Power Hour, The - Tour Guide
 Kangaroo Jack: G'Day U.S.A.! - Outback Ollie
 The Lorax - Additional voices
 Macahans, The - Mountain Man
 Monsters, Inc. (2001) - Additional voices
 Monsters University - Additional voices
 Mosaic - Tour Guide, Belligerent Detective
 Minions - Additional voices
 The Secret Life of Pets - Additional voices
 Party Central - Dad (credited as James Kevin Ward)
 Porco Rosso - Additional voices
 Ratchet & Clank - Captain Copernicus Qwark
 Spider-Man - Project Coordinator
 The Fairly OddParents in School's Out! The Musical - Chet Ubetcha, Flunky
 Toy Story 3 - Additional voices
 Superman/Batman: Apocalypse - Radio DJ
 Treasure Planet - Additional voices
 Ultimate Avengers - Herr Kleiser
 Ultimate Avengers 2 - Herr Kleiser
 WALL-E (2008) - Additional voices

Video games
 Age of Empires III: The Asian Dynasties - Tokugawa Ieyasu
 Arcanum: Of Steamworks and Magick Obscura - Arronax, Gar, Joachim, Nasrudin
 Batman: Arkham Knight - Firefighter Adamson, Officer Williams, Sergeant McAllister, additional voices
 Ben 10: Protector of Earth - XLR8, Wildvine
 Bionicle - Pohatu Nuva
 Call of Duty - German PA Officer, Additional voices
 Call of Duty: United Offensive - Cpl. Kulikov, Additional voices
 Call of Duty: Modern Warfare 2 - Ranger #1, Shadow Company Soldier #2, Additional voices
 Command & Conquer: Generals - Additional voices
 Command & Conquer: Generals Zero Hour - Additional voices
 Crusaders of Might and Magic - Additional voices
 Defense Grid: The Awakening - Fletcher
 Destroy All Humans! - Arkvoodle of the Sacred Crotch
 Destroy All Humans! - Bert Whither, Mayor, Power Suit Soldier, Worker 2
 2 - Additional voices
 Big Willy Unleashed - Mr. Pork, Toxoplasma Gondii, Jimbo the Furontech Correspondent
 Path of the Furon - American Males
 Diablo III - Belial
 Dirge of Cerberus: Final Fantasy VII - Incidental Characters
 Doom 3 - Additional voices
 Dota 2 - Defense Grid Announcer Pack (as Fletcher)
 Dragon Age II - Orsino, additional voices
 Eat Lead: The Return of Matt Hazard - Sting Sniperscope
 The Elder Scrolls Online - Mannimarco
 Escape from Monkey Island - Drunk, Tony the Catapult Operator
 EverQuest II - Various voices
 Evil Dead: Regeneration - Dr. Vladimir Reinhard, Prof. Raymond Knowby
 Fairly Odd Parents: Shadow Showdown, The - Chet Ubetcha
 Fallout 4 - RobCo Battlezone Announcer (Nuka-World) & Old Longfellow (Far Harbor)
 Fallout: New Vegas - Dr. Klein, Sink Intelligence Unit, Sink Auto-Doc (Old World Blues)
 F.E.A.R. - Commissioner Betters
 Final Fantasy XIII - Additional voices
 Guild Wars 2 - Tybalt Leftpaw
 Grim Fandango - Hector LeMans, Gunnar, Doug
 The Hobbit - Gandalf
 Killer7 - Toru Fukushima
 Kingdom of Paradise - Genra
 Lost Planet 2 - Various
 Mercenaries 2: World in Flames - Ramon Solano
 King's Quest VIII: Mask of Eternity - Armor Seller Gnome, Hillman, Unseen Voice
 The Lord of the Rings: The Two Towers - Additional voices
 MadWorld - Agent XIII, Killseeker D, Police Chief
 Marvel vs. Capcom 3: Fate of Two Worlds - Sentinel
 Marvel Ultimate Alliance 3: The Black Order - Additional voices
 Metal Gear Solid 3: Snake Eater - Director Aleksandr Leonovich Granin
 Metal Gear Rising: Revengeance - Wilhelm "Doktor" Voigt
 Nicktoons: Attack of the Toybots - Chad-bot, Biggest Genius Host, Evil Toy Co. Employee
 Ninety-Nine Nights II - Zirrick
 Ninja Blade - Tojiro Kurokawa
 Nuclear Strike - Additional voices
 Painkiller - Asmodeus
 PlayStation All-Stars Battle Royale - Captain Copernicus Qwark, Resistance Soldier
 Prey – Additional voices
 Quake Champions - Ranger
 Ratchet & Clank (2002-2016) - Captain Copernicus Qwark
 2002 - Deserter, Gadgetron CEO
 2016 Remake - Qwark Bot, Hoverboarder #1, Warbot #2, Blarg #3
 Going Commando - Abercrombie Fizzwidget, UltraTech Announcer, Corp Announcer, Qwark Bot Galactic Greetings Announcer
 Up Your Arsenal - Tyrranoid Host, Scorpio, Skrunch
 Ratchet: Deadlocked - Shellshock, Groom
 Size Matters - Otto Destruct, PlantMan, Robot Head, Skrunch, Announcer
 Secret Agent Clank
 Ratchet & Clank Future subseries
 Tools of Destruction
 A Crack In Time
 All 4 One - Commander Spog
 Full Frontal Assault
 Red Dead Redemption 2 – The Local Pedestrian Population
 Resident Evil - Jack Krauser
 4
 The Darkside Chronicles
 Resonance of Fate - Rowen
 Rise of Nightmares - Peter
 SOCOM II U.S. Navy SEALs - Russian Spetznaz Operative Polaris
 SpongeBob's Atlantis SquarePantis - Additional Voices
 Star Ocean: Integrity and Faithlessness - President Mutal
 Star Trek: Armada II - Additional voices
 Star Wars - Mars Guo
 Bounty Hunter - Alien Thug #2, Dug, Meeko Ghintee
 Episode I Racer - Fud Sang
 Jedi Starfighter - Additional voices
 Knights of the Old Republic - Additional voices
 Racer Revenge - Scorch Zanales
 Starfighter - Pirate Ground Control, Wingman
 The Saboteur - Vittore
 The Sopranos: Road to Respect - Additional voices
 The SpongeBob SquarePants Movie - Additional voices
 Tomb Raider: Anniversary - Pierre DuPont
 Transformers: Fall of Cybertron - Perceptor
 Transformers: Rise of the Dark Spark - Perceptor
 Vampire: The Masquerade – Bloodlines - additional voices
 White Knight Chronicles - Sarvain
 White Knight Chronicles II - Sarvain, Ledom
 Wolfenstein - Scribe, Additional voices
 X-Men Legends II: Rise of Apocalypse - Colossus, James Hudson

Other
 Small Fry - Franklin the Eagle
 Super Mario Bros. Super Show - Patty's dad, Count Dracula
 Diff'rent Strokes - Voice of "Kit", the car on Knight Rider (1984)
 The Haunted Hathaways - Voice of Wags in episode "Haunted Dog" (2013)

References
 Young, Steve. "The Lord of Loud Laughs: Meet Jim Ward", American Politics Journal'', April 30, 2006.

External links
 Official Web Site
 Apocryphal but true
 
 
 The Stephanie Miller Show
 Jim Ward Fan Club

Living people
American radio personalities
American male voice actors
American male video game actors
American impressionists (entertainers)
Daytime Emmy Award winners
Male actors from New York (state)
Comedians from California
People with Alzheimer's disease
Year of birth missing (living people)